The Battle of Taranto was a World War II battle in 1940.

Battle of Taranto may also refer to one of the battles between the Carthaginians and the Roman Republic:
 Battle of Tarentum (212 BC)
 Battle of Tarentum (209 BC)

See also
 Battle of Tauroento (49 BC), between Caesarian and Pompeian forces near modern Marseille during the Roman Civil War